The Rapides River is a river in the Côte-Nord region of Quebec, Canada. It empties into the Gulf of Saint Lawrence.

Location

The mouth of the Rapides River is in the municipality of Sept-Îles in the Sept-Rivières Regional County Municipality.
It enters Sept-Îles bay to the west of the community of Sept-Îles.
The origin of the name is not known. It was made official on 5 December 1968.

The Aylmer-Whittom Park at the mouth of the river, also known as Squirrel Park, is an area of natural mixed woodland, dominated by spruce and lichen.
There are several trails through the park, and two observation towers to observe the bay and the birds that nest there.
One tower has observation binoculars.
There is a miniature village for children.

Description

According to the Dictionnaire des rivières et lacs de la province de Québec (1914),

Basin

The Rapides River basin cover .
It lies between the basins of the Sainte-Marguerite River to the west and the Moisie River to the east.
The basin is partly in the unorganized territory of Lac-Walker (80.7%) and partly in the municipality of Sept-Îles (19.3%).

The bedrock is mainly magmatic, deformed to some extent, including migmatite, anorthosite, gabbronorite and granodioritic or granitoid gneiss.
Some of the valleys hold glaciofluvial sediments.
In the piedmont and the coastal plain large amounts of silt and clay were deposited by the Goldthwait Sea after the glaciers retreated.
As the land rebounded from the weight of the ice and the sea retreated, these fine sediments were covered by coarse sandy estuarine and deltaic sediments.

Hydrology

The rivers and streams in the northern plateau follow angular courses dictated by fractures in the bedrock, which are fairly rectilinear and constrained by narrow valleys.
Downstream the watercourses meander in the soft deposits of the piedmont and coastal plain.
The main tributaries of the Rapides River are the Desmeules, Deschênes and Champion rivers, which drain the northeast, southeast and southwest parts of the watershed.
The Bouleau waterfall on the Rapides River is above its confluence with the Desmeules River.

Waterbodies cover 8.31% of the basin.
Ombrotrophic peat bogs cover 0.95% of the area, mostly on the coastal plain with its flat relief and fine sediments.

A gauging station  from the Rapides River's mouth made continuous measurements from 1947 to 1983.

Environment

A map of the ecological regions of Quebec shows the river in sub-regions 6j-T and 6m-T of the east spruce/moss subdomain.
The forest cover is dominated by black spruce (Picea mariana), balsam fir (Abies balsamea) and to a lesser extent hardwoods such as paper birch (Betula papyrifera), trembling aspen (Populus tremuloides) and balsam poplar (Populus balsamifera).
The Rapides River is not recognized as a salmon river. 
Fish species are rainbow smelt (Osmerus mordax), American eel (Anguilla rostrata), brook trout (Salvelinus fontinalis), ninespine stickleback (Pungitius pungitius) and lake whitefish (Coregonus clupeaformis).

Notes

Sources

 Rivers of Côte-Nord